Stacie Curtis (born Devereaux; May 27, 1986) is a curler originally from St. John's, Newfoundland and Labrador.  She is a four-time provincial junior champion, three time provincial women's champion and 2007 Canadian Junior champion and World Junior silver medalist.

Curling career
Curtis represented Newfoundland and Labrador at the 2003 Canada Games, placing 7th.

Curtis won her first provincial junior championship in 2004. Her debut performance as skip of team Newfoundland and Labrador at the 2004 Canadian Junior Curling Championships was somewhat successful, the rink finished with an 8–4 record, just missing the playoffs. Devereaux would win her second straight provincial junior crown the following year. Her record at the 2005 Canadian Junior Curling Championships was not as great, having finished with a 5–7 record. Curtis won a third straight provincial title in 2006. Once again she missed the playoffs at the Canadian Juniors, finishing with a 5–6 record. Devereaux won her fourth and final provincial junior championship in 2007. Her performance at the Canadian Juniors was much better. Her team of Steph Guzzwell, Sarah Paul and Julie Devereaux finished the round robin in first place with an 11–1 record. Curtis defeated Manitoba's Calleen Neufeld 7–6 in the final to win the Canadian Junior championship. This marked the first time a team from Newfoundland and Labrador won a women's Canadian Junior championship. This qualified her to represent Canada at the 2007 World Junior Curling Championships. Curtis finished the round robin with a 6–3 record, in 2nd place behind the United States. She beat Denmark 10–6 in the semi-final only to lose to Scotland's Sarah Reid 7–6 in the final.

In 2009, she played in her first provincial championship. She finished with a 2–4 record. The following year, she improved to a 4–2 record, losing to Heather Strong in the semi-finals. Finally, at the 2011 provincial championship, Curtis won the title, going undefeated and beating Shelley Nichols in the provincial final. This qualified Curtis for the 2011 Scotties Tournament of Hearts, where she finished in last place with a 1–10 record. Curtis would not return to the Hearts in 2012, as her team lost in the provincial semi-final. However, the following year, she went on to win her second provincial title, and once again represent Newfoundland and Labrador at the Hearts. At the 2013 Scotties Tournament of Hearts she once again struggled, finishing with a 2–9 record.

The next two seasons, Curtis struggled at the provincial championships going 1-3 at the 2014 Newfoundland and Labrador Scotties Tournament of Hearts and 0-4 in 2015. Finally, she won another provincial title in 2016, winning all four of her matches. Representing her province at the 2016 Scotties Tournament of Hearts, she finished with a 3-8 record. Curtis would go on to win the 2017 Newfoundland and Labrador Scotties Tournament of Hearts, defeating Shelley Hardy in a playoff after a 3-1 round robin record. At the 2017 Scotties Tournament of Hearts, Curtis improved on her previous record, finishing 5-6. At the 2018 Newfoundland and Labrador Scotties Tournament of Hearts, Curtis finished the round robin with a 5-1 record, but won all of her playoff games, including beating the previously undefeated Heather Strong team twice. At the 2018 Scotties Tournament of Hearts, Curtis led her province to a 4-3 record in group play, but lost to Ontario in a tiebreaker to move on to the championship pool. She then lost to New Brunswick's Sylvie Robichaud in the 9th place game.

Personal life
Curtis was employed as a border services officer for the Canada Border Services Agency. She is married to Justin Curtis, and have two children. They moved to Miami circa 2018.

References

External links

1986 births
Curlers from Newfoundland and Labrador
Living people
Canadian women curlers
Sportspeople from St. John's, Newfoundland and Labrador
Canadian emigrants to the United States
Sportspeople from Miami